Mór is a district in north-western part of Fejér County. Mór is also the name of the town where the district seat is found. The district is located in the Central Transdanubia Statistical Region.

Geography 
Mór District borders with Kisbér District and Oroszlány District (Komárom-Esztergom County) to the north, Bicske District to the east, Székesfehérvár District to the east and south, Várpalota District (Veszprém County) to the southwest, Zirc District (Veszprém County) to the west. The number of the inhabited places in Mór District is 13.

Municipalities 
The district has 2 towns and 11 villages.
(ordered by population, as of 1 January 2012)

The bolded municipalities are cities.

See also
List of cities and towns in Hungary

References

External links
 Postal codes of the Mór District

Districts in Fejér County